The Italian order of battle for the Second Italo-Ethiopian War on 8 October 1935. The Ethiopian order of battle is listed separately.

Comando Supremo Africa Orientale

Commander: General Emilio De Bono to November 1935, Field Marshal Pietro Badoglio November 1935 – June 1936
 7th Artillery Group (77/28 field guns)
 Granatieri di Sardegna Battalion (coming from Italy)
 Alpini Battalion (coming from Italy)
 Guardia di Finanza Battalion (coming from Italy)
 3 Assault Battalions (still in Italy)
 7th Artillery Group (Obice da 149/13 howitzer) (coming from Italy)
 Engineer Unit Comando Supremo Africa Orientale
 Bombardment, Reconnaissance, and Fighter Aviation Command A. O. – Gen. Mario Ajmone Cat
 3rd Air Brigade – Brig.Gen. Ferruccio Ranza Eritrea (145 aircraft)
 HQ Flight (4 × Caproni Ca.101 light bomber/transport aircraft)
 Reconnaissance Squadron (un-numbered):
 34th Reconnaissance Flight (8 × Romeo Ro.1 reconnaissance and ground attack aircraft) attached to Eritrean Corps
 38th Reconnaissance Flight (10 × Ro.1)
 41st Reconnaissance Flight (10 × Ro.1)
 103rd Reconnaissance Flight (9 × IMAM Ro.37)
 116th Reconnaissance Flight (10 × Ro.1)
 118th Reconnaissance Flight (10 × Ro.1) attached to II Army Corps
 131st Reconnaissance Flight (10 × Ro.1)
 Libyan Reconnaissance Flight (11 × Ro.1) attached to I Army Corps
 106th Fighter Flight (7 × CR.20)
 4th Bombers Squadron – Brig.Gen. Attilio Matricardi
 14th Bomber Flight "Hic Sunt Leones" – (10 × Caproni Ca.101 D/2)
 15th Bomber Flight "La Disperata" – (10 × Ca.101 D/2)
 27th Bomber Squadron
 17th Bomber Flight (5 × Caproni Ca.111 light bombers)
 18th Bomber Flight (5 × Ca.111)
 Hydroplanes Detachments (4 × Marinens Flyvebaatfabrikk M.F.4 floatplane and 2 × CANT 25 flying boat fighter)
 7th Bomber Wing detached to Somalia with 38 aircraft – Brig.Gen. Ferruccio Ranza (see below)

Northern Front – Eritrea
 I Army Corps – Ruggiero Santini
 26th Infantry Division "Assietta" – Gen. Enrico Riccardi
 30th Infantry Division "Sabauda" – Gen. Italo Gariboldi
 5th Alpine Division "Pusteria" – Gen. Luigi Negri Cesi
 4th CC.NN. Division "3 Gennaio" (still in Italy) – Gen. Alessandro Traditi
 X Battalion indigeni (Eritrean Ascari)
 XV Battalion indigeni (Eritrean Ascari)
 Banda dello Scimezana (native troop)
 5th Cavalry Squadrons Group
 3rd Motorized Artillery Group (77 mm/28)
 5th Motorized Artillery Group (105/28 cannons)
 Artillery Command of positions of Agame
 I Army Corps A.O. Engineer Unit
 Libyan Reconnaissance Flight (11 × Ro.1)
 II Army Corps – Pietro Maravigna
 19th Infantry Division "Gavinana" – Gen. Nino Salvatore Villa Santa
 24th Infantry Division "Gran Sasso" – Gen. Adalberto Principe (Adi Ugri-Quala zone)
 3rd CC.NN. Division "21 Aprile" – Gen. Giacomo Appiotti
 Gruppo Bande Altopiano (native troop)
 10th Cavalry Squadrons Group
 Artillery Group Command (100 mm/17)
 Artillery Command of positions in western Tigre (Eritrean Ascari)
 2nd Corps Engineer Unit
 118th Reconnaissance Flight (10 × Ro.1) (Libyan)
 Eritrean Corps – Alessandro Pirzio Biroli
 1st Eritrean Division – Gen. Salvatore di Pietro
 2nd Eritrean Division – Gen. Achille Vaccarisi
 1st CC.NN. Division "23 Marzo" – Maj.Gen. Ettore Bastico
 1st Eritrean CC.NN. Battalion Group – Filippo Diamanti
 1st, 2nd, 3rd and 4th Italian East African CC.NN. Infantry Battalions
 East African CC.NN. MMG Company
 Banda dell'Hassamò (Irregular troop)
 6th Cavalry Squadrons Group
 Native Cavalry Squadron Group (Eritrean Ascari troop)
 2nd Motorized Artillery Group 77 mm/28
 3rd Motorized Artillery Group 100 mm/17 gun
 4th Fast Tanks Squadrons Group
 Artillery Command of positions in eastern Tigre
 Eritrean Corps Engineer Unit
 34th Reconnaissance Flight (8 × Ro.1)(Libyan)
 Western Lowlands Zone – Brig.Gen. Amedeo Couture
 XXVII Battalion indigeni (Eritrean Ascari)
 XXVIII Battalion indigeni (Eritrean Ascari)
 Irregulars Foot Bands Group
 "Celere" (fast) Group
 Eritrea Fast Tanks Squadron
 Eastern Lowlands Zone – Brig.Gen. Oreste Mariotti
 XXIV Battalion indigeni (Eritrean Ascari)
 XXVI Battalion indigeni (Eritrean Ascari)
 Libyan Battalion
 Massaua Irregulars Band
 Northern Dankalia Irregulars Band
 Southern Dankalia Irregulars Band
 7th Artillery Battery (120L25)
 37th Artillery Battery (77L28 – pack camels)

Sent to the front in February 1936
 III Army Corps – Lt.Gen. Ettore Bastico
 27th Infantry Division "Sila" (coming from Italy) – Gen. Francesco Bertini
 1st CC.NN. Division "23 Marzo" – Gen. Filiberto Ludovico from Eritrean Corps

Formed in January 1936
 IV Army Corps – Gen. Ezio Babbini
 5th Infantry Division "Cosseria" – Gen. Pietro Pintor
 2nd CC.NN. Division "28 Ottobre" – Gen. Umberto Somma
 5th CC.NN. Division "1 Febbraio" (still in Italy) – Gen. Attilio Teruzzi

Organized in March 1936
 Celere Column A.O. (Eritrea), Lt.Gen. Achille Starace
 82nd CC.NN. Battalion "Mussolini"/6th CC.NN. Battalions Group, motorised
 3rd Bersaglieri Regiment
 8th Artillery Group (77 mm/28, motorised)
 Included truck-transported machine-guns, armoured cars, altogether 3,000 men and 500 motor vehicles.

Southern Front – Somaliland
 Graziani Column – General Rodolfo Graziani
 29th Infantry Division "Peloritana" – Gen. Giuseppe Pavone
 Libyan Division (Libyan Colonial troops) – Guglielmo Nasi
 6th CC.NN. Division "Tevere" (still in Italy) – Enrico Boscardi
 Regiment "Lancieri di Aosta"
 6x Battalions, Royal Colonial Troop Corps (Arabo-Somali Colonial troops)
 Camel Mounted Artillery
 6x Dubat Bands (Companies of Somali Irregulars)
 Ogaden border region command – Colonel Luigi Frusci
 9 L3 tanks, 20 Armoured cars
 6 Royal Colonial Troop Corps Battalions (Arabo-Somali Colonial troops)
 6 Dubat Bands (Companies of Somali Irregulars)
 150 trucks
 Sultan Olol Dinke Column (Feudal Army) – Olol Dinke, Sultan of Sciavelli
 1000 Dubat (mounted Somali warriors of the Ajuran clan)
 7th Bomber Wing – Brig.Gen. Ferruccio Ranza (38 aircraft)
 25th Bomber Squadron:
 8th Bomber Flight (10 × Ca.101 bis)
 9th Bomber Flight (10 × Ca.101 bis)
 Reconnaissance Flight (10 × Ro.1)
 107th Fighter Flight (8 × CR.20)

Notes
The 7th CC.NN. Division "Cirene" was deployed in Libya to threaten the Suez Canal should the British close it to Italian traffic. It was never deployed to Ethiopia but was considered to have taken part in the campaign. It actually acted as a local garrison and engaged in various construction projects.

See also
 Second Italo-Ethiopian War
 List of Second Italo-Ethiopian War weapons of Italy
 Ethiopian order of battle in the Second Italo-Ethiopian War

Footnotes

References

External links
 Regio Esercito:La Milizia nella Campagna d'Africa 1935–1936 Now on Internet Archive, archived on May 19, 2007
 Italian Army of the Ethiopian Conquest
 Italian Air Force in Italian East Africa 1919–1939, Part I – End of 1919 to 3 October 1935 (Invasion of Ethiopia)
 Generals of WWII: Italy

Military history of Italy
Orders of battle
1935 in Italy
1936 in Italy
Second Italo-Ethiopian War